Alhashem or Al Hashem or Al-e Hashem, also known as Alishma, may refer to:
 Alhashem-e Olya
 Alhashem-e Sofla